Soufiane Choubani (born 1984 in Casablanca) is an entrepreneur, author, Moroccan/American teacher and international debate coach.

He grew up in Franklin Township, Somerset County, New Jersey, United States and attended Franklin High School, where he competed on the school's Model UN team. After graduating from Kean University and studying psychology at Institut libre Marie Haps, he returned to Morocco and in 2014, founded of the Moroccan National Debate Team, Moroccan-Youth Debate Camp and Morocco Debate Association. The Moroccan National Debate Team became the first ever North African nation to compete in the World Individual Debating and Public Speaking Championships, the World Schools Debating Championship & the African Schools Debating Championship. He is also credited for the creation of a similar team in Tunisia.

Professional career

In 2008, Soufiane became an internationally certified doping control offer (DCO) after training in Morocco and France. He was one of the first two Moroccans to become a DCO and during his time, he was very effective in tracking and collecting samples from athletes. He was quickly promoted to DCO Team Leader for North Africa. In total, 6 athletes tested positive for banned performance-enhancing drugs with suspensions ranging from 2 years to one who received a lifetime suspension.

In 2012, Soufiane volunteered as a doping control officer (DCO) at the 2012 Summer Olympics in London and shortly after, he received a Letter of Appreciation from David Cameron thanking him for his services, making him one of only a handful of Moroccans to receive such recognition from a British Prime Minister.

After back-to-back national championships in 2013 and 2014, and being awarded with the Best Coach in Morocco Award, he founded the Moroccan National Debate Team and led them to the 2014 & 2015 World Schools Debating Championships. The Moroccan National Debate Team made history in 2014 by becoming the first North African Nation to compete in the World Schools Debating Championships. That same year, he organized the first international high school debate competition in Tangier at the American Legation, Tangier, which was sponsored by QatarDebate. In 2015, he bid to host the WSDC in Rabat, Morocco in 2017 but the right to host was ultimately awarded to Bali, Indonesia. Had the bid been successful, Morocco would have become only the second African nation to host the WSDC.

In 2021, he founded the African Schools Debate Council with the goal of helping African nations to create national debate teams and participate in the World Schools Debating Championship

In 2022, he coached the Moroccan National Debate Team debaters that became the first ever North Africans to compete in the World Individual Debating and Public Speaking Championships

Personal life

Soufiane's uncle Lahbib Choubani is a Moroccan politician of the Justice and Development Party. Since 3 January 2012, he holds the position of Minister of Relations with the Parliament & Civil Society in Abdelilah Benkirane's cabinet.

In 2022, while in Ukraine to help set up a speech & debate club at Biotechnological Lyceum "Radovel" he found himself stuck in Kyiv after the Russian Army invaded. In the end, it took him 5 days to cross the border into Poland and then fly back to Morocco.

References

External links
 Aujourdhui.ma
 Teammorocco.org
 Moroccoworldnews.com
 Hitradio.ma
 Schoolsdebate.com
 USATF.org
 Africanschoolsdebates.org
 Worldspeechday.com/ambassadors

Living people
Date of birth missing (living people)
1984 births
Franklin High School (New Jersey) alumni
People from Casablanca
People from Franklin Township, Somerset County, New Jersey
People from North Brunswick, New Jersey
Moroccan schoolteachers
21st-century Moroccan educators